Blitz is a Brazilian rock band. The band was the first to achieve mainstream success and to have hit singles (Você não soube me amar, A dois passos do paraíso, Ana Maria (biquíni de bolinha amarelinha tão pequenininho)) kick-starting the 1980s movement that would later be called "BRock". Its "classic" formation included Evandro Mesquita (voice), Lobão (drums, later Roberto "Juba" Gurgel), Antônio Pedro Fortuna (bass, formerly with Os Mutantes and Lulu Santos), William Forghieri (keyboards) and Fernanda Abreu and Márcia Bulcão (backing vocals). Their Aventuras II album was nominated for the 2017 Latin Grammy Award for Best Portuguese Language Rock or Alternative Album.

Discography

Studio albums 
 (1982) As Aventuras da Blitz
 (1983) Radio Atividade
 (1984) Blitz 3
 (1997) Línguas
 (2009) Eskute Blitz

Live albums 

 (1994) Blitz ao Vivo
 (2007) Blitz ao Vivo e a Cores
 (2010) Eskute & Veja Blitz
 (2013) Multishow Registro: Blitz 30 Anos - Ipanema
 (2017) Blitz no Circo Voador

References

Brazilian rock music groups